Birger Larsen may refer to:

Birger Larsen (footballer) (born 1942), former Danish football player
Birger Larsen (director) (1961–2016), Danish film director and screenwriter
Birger Larsen, bassist for the Norwegian blackened death metal band Grimfist